St. Agnes Catholic Church is located in the LaSalle Park neighborhood of Detroit, Michigan. The church was notable for hosting Mother Teresa in 1979 when she established a Missionaries of Charity convent at the church. In 1990, the St. Agnes parish was closed, reopening as Martyrs of Uganda until 2006.

Roman Catholic churches in Detroit
Roman Catholic churches in Michigan
Churches completed in 1914